Travis Brigley (born June 16, 1977) is a Canadian former professional ice hockey player. He has formerly played professionally for the Calgary Flames and Colorado Avalanche in the National Hockey League (NHL).

Playing career
Brigley was drafted 39th overall, by the Calgary Flames in the 1996 NHL Entry Draft after playing four years with Lethbridge Hurricanes of the WHL. Brigley made his professional debut in the 1997–98 season with the Saint John Flames of the AHL. He also made his NHL debut with Calgary in the same year playing in 2 games.

In the 1999–2000 season, Brigley was traded by the Flames to the Philadelphia Flyers for Marc Bureau on March 6, 2000. In the 2000–01 season, Brigley briefly played in Wales, UK with the Cardiff Devils before signing as a free agent with the Florida Panthers on December 16, 2000.

Brigley played for the Panthers affiliate, the Louisville Panthers of the AHL before signing as a free agent with the Cincinnati Mighty Ducks for the 2001–02 season. Following impressive play for Cincinnati, Travis was signed by parent club the Mighty Ducks of Anaheim on January 22, 2002.

On August 12, 2003, Brigley was traded by the Ducks to the Colorado Avalanche. He made his long-awaited return to the NHL, playing in a career-high 36 games for the Avalanche in 2003–04.  During the NHL lockout, Brigley signed in Norway, he won the Norgesmester for Vålerenga.

Brigley returned to North America for the 2005–06 season when he signed with the New York Islanders on September 2, 2005. Brigley never played with the Islanders, spending the season in the AHL with the Bridgeport Sound Tigers and the Springfield Falcons. Brigley returned to Europe the following season signing with German team Augsburger Panther of the DEL. After two seasons of missing the playoffs with the Panthers, Brigley signed with the Hamburg Freezers for the 2008–09 season.

On October 12, 2009, Brigley signed with Slovenian team HDD Olimpija Ljubljana of the Erste Bank Eishockey Liga. After playing in only 22 games Brigley left the team on December 23, 2009. In finishing the season, Travis returned to Canada and played in a brief stint with the Bentley Generals in the senior AAA Alberta based, Chinook Hockey League.

Career statistics

References

External links

1977 births
Living people
Augsburger Panther players
Bridgeport Sound Tigers players
Calgary Flames draft picks
Calgary Flames players
Canadian expatriate sportspeople in Norway
Cardiff Devils players
Cincinnati Mighty Ducks players
Colorado Avalanche players
Detroit Vipers players
Hamburg Freezers players
HDD Olimpija Ljubljana players
Hershey Bears players
Knoxville Speed players
Lethbridge Hurricanes players
Louisville Panthers players
Macon Whoopee (ECHL) players
People from the County of Paintearth No. 18
Philadelphia Phantoms players
Saint John Flames players
Springfield Falcons players
Vålerenga Ishockey players
Canadian expatriate sportspeople in Wales
Canadian expatriate sportspeople in the United States
Canadian ice hockey left wingers
Canadian expatriate ice hockey players in Slovenia
Canadian expatriate ice hockey players in Germany